

Events

Asia Minor
King Sardur II shows the cities in the kingdom of Urartu strengthen against the Cimmerians.

Italy
The Ionian Greeks found the cities of Cumae and Naples in the Gulf of Naples.
Romulus, the legendary co-founder of Rome, holds the first Roman triumph to celebrate a military victory following the Rape of the Sabine Women.

Births

Deaths

References

750s BC